Myrmecothea is a genus of picture-winged flies in the family Ulidiidae.

Species
Myrmecothea myrmecoides (Loew, 1860)

References

Ulidiidae
Brachycera genera
Diptera of North America
Taxa named by Friedrich Georg Hendel
Monotypic Brachycera genera